Rhodopteriana distincta is a moth in the  family Eupterotidae. It was described by Rothschild in 1917. It is found in the Democratic Republic of Congo, Eritrea, Rwanda and Tanzania.

References

Janinae
Moths described in 1917